The Institute of Politics (IOP) is an institute of Harvard Kennedy School at Harvard University that was created to serve as a living memorial to President John F. Kennedy and to inspire Harvard undergraduates to consider careers in politics and public service. The IOP works to bring the academic world into contact with the world of politics and public affairs in a non-partisan way to promote public service.

History and structure 

Following President Kennedy's death in 1963, the Kennedy Library Corporation raised more than $20 million for both the construction of the John F. Kennedy Presidential Library and Museum in Boston, and for creation and endowment of an institute at Harvard University dedicated to the study of politics and public affairs. More than 30 million people from around the world, including school children, contributed to the fund. In 1966, the Kennedy Library Corporation presented Harvard University with an endowment for the creation of the Institute of Politics.

The IOP does not offer formal courses or degree-granting programs. The IOP hosts the John F. Kennedy Jr. Forum, located at the Harvard Kennedy School. The forum regularly hosts speeches, debates, and panel discussions. Since its founding in 1978, the Forum has hosted more than 1,000 events, seen by live audiences totaling more than 650,000 people and millions more via cable television, teleconferencing, and the Internet. Originally known as the KSG Forum, it was renamed in 2002 in tribute to the president's son, who had served on the Institute of Politics' board of directors until his death in 1999. The forum was renovated in 2003.

Senior Advisory Committee 
The following individuals make up the Senior Advisory Committee of the Institute of Politics:
 Michael Nutter, Chair
 David Axelrod
 Charles Frank Bolden Jr.
 LaTosha Brown
 Alex Burns
 Heather Campion
 Torie Clarke
 William D. Delahunt
 Joseph Kennedy III
 Susan Molinari
 Abby Phillip
 Olympia Snowe
 Alice Stewart
 Michelle Wu

Harvard Votes Challenge 
In 2018, students at the IOP started the Harvard Votes Challenge (HVC) in collaboration with the Ash Center for Democratic Governance and Innovation. The university-wide initiative "strives to build a civic culture at Harvard University by increasing voter registration and participation among students, staff, and faculty." During the 2018 midterm election, HVC launched the first-ever Harvard-Yale Votes Challenge. HVC integrated voter engagement and registration into First-Year Orientation in 2019. For the 2020 election, 390 volunteers from all 12 degree-granting Harvard schools worked to mobilize voters during the COVID-19 pandemic. Organizers sent 94,297 text messages, distributed over 1700 stamps to students, and recruited 121 campus organizations to a pledge committing to 100% voter participation.

Harvard Public Opinion Project 
Founded in 2000, the Harvard Public Opinion Project (HPOP) aims to track young Americans' (18- to 29-year-olds) attitudes toward politics and public service. Undergraduate members, in conjunction with the IOP's director of polling, John Della Volpe, conduct the largest national survey of the millennial generation. These form a tracking poll in the fall and a more comprehensive poll in the spring. After analyzing the data, the committee shares its findings in a nationally covered media release.

Harvard Political Review 
The IOP is also home to and publishes the Harvard Political Review (HPR), a quarterly, non-partisan journal of political affairs written, edited, and managed by Harvard College undergraduates.

See also 
 Harvard University people

References

External links 
 Harvard Institute of Politics website
 Google Cultural Institute: Harvard Institute of Politics

 
1966 establishments in Massachusetts
Educational institutions established in 1966
Harvard Kennedy School
Harvard University research institutes
Monuments and memorials to John F. Kennedy in the United States
Public policy research
Research institutes in Massachusetts
Student political organizations in the United States